Martin Donnelly may refer to:

 Martin Donnelly (civil servant) (born 1958), former Permanent Secretary of the Department for Business, Innovation and Skills in the UK 
 Martin Donnelly (sportsman) (1917–1999), sportsman who represented New Zealand at cricket and England at rugby union
 Martin Donnelly (footballer, born 1951), Northern Irish footballer active in the NASL in the 1970s and 1980s
 Martin Donnelly (footballer, born 1988), Northern Irish footballer who plays for Cliftonville
 Martin Donnelly (racing driver) (born 1964), Northern Irish racing driver